Jean Cugnot (3 August 1899 – 25 June 1933) was a racing cyclist from  France. He competed for France in the 1924 Summer Olympics held in Paris, France in the tandem event where he finished in first place and in the individual sprint event where he finished in third place.

References

1899 births
1933 deaths
Burials at Montmartre Cemetery
French male cyclists
Olympic cyclists of France
Olympic gold medalists for France
Olympic bronze medalists for France
Cyclists at the 1924 Summer Olympics
Olympic medalists in cycling
French track cyclists
Cyclists from Paris
Medalists at the 1924 Summer Olympics